Scott Brown (born May 22, 1983) is an American professional golfer who plays on the PGA Tour.

Brown attended the University of South Carolina Aiken, playing collegiate golf for the Pacers at the Division II-level. He turned professional in 2006, and begun playing mini-tours. He played on the NGA Hooters Tour from 2007 to 2009 and finished on top of the eGolf Professional Tour money list in 2009, with three wins. In 2010 and 2011 he played on the Nationwide Tour, recording five top-three finishes in 2011 to finish eighth on the money list and earn a PGA Tour card for 2012. Brown missed his first six PGA Tour cuts before finished tied for fifth at the 2012 Puerto Rico Open.

Brown had two fifth-place finishes in 2012, but could only manage to place 148th on the PGA Tour money list, barely maintaining conditional status by $4,468. He started the 2013 season dividing his time between the PGA Tour and Web.com Tour. Brown regained his PGA Tour card through 2015 with a win at the 2013 Puerto Rico Open. He qualified for the 2013 Open Championship and as a Tour winner, the 2013 PGA Championship.

Professional wins (4)

PGA Tour wins (1)

PGA Tour playoff record (0–1)

eGolf Tour wins (3)
2009 Bushnell Championship, Forest Oaks Classic, Cabarrus Classic

Results in major championships

CUT = missed the half-way cut
"T" indicates a tie for a place

Results in The Players Championship

CUT = missed the halfway cut
"T" indicates a tie for a place
C = Canceled after the first round due to the COVID-19 pandemic

See also
2011 Nationwide Tour graduates

References

External links

American male golfers
PGA Tour golfers
Korn Ferry Tour graduates
Golfers from Augusta, Georgia
Golfers from South Carolina
USC Aiken Pacers athletes
Sportspeople from Aiken, South Carolina
Brown, Scott (golfer)
Brown, Scott (golfer)